Nenad Nikolić (Serbian Cyrillic: Ненад Николић; born 12 August 1984) is a Serbian former footballer who played as a defender.

Playing career 
Nikolić began his youth career in 1994 with Red Star Belgrade in the famed 1984 generation which produced the likes of Dušan Basta, Boško Janković and Dejan Milovanović. In 2002, he was promoted to the senior side but did not feature in official matches. Due to their similar playing style, he was nicknamed Žonsa after Polish footballer Tomasz Rząsa.

Throughout his career in Europe, he played in Serbia with the likes of FK Big Bull Radnički, FK Jedinstvo Surčin, FK BASK, FK Zemun. He played in the Croatian First Football League with NK Inter Zaprešić. He also played in the top flight of football in Hungary with Vasas SC, and played in the Football League with Apollon Smyrni F.C.

In 2012, he went overseas to Canada to sign with London City of the Canadian Soccer League. In 2013, he signed with expansion franchise Burlington SC. He played with Burlington for three seasons, and qualified for postseason in two seasons. After the departure of Burlington from the CSL he signed with Brantford Galaxy for the 2016 season.

Managerial career 
In 2012, he served as an assistant coach for London City SC in the Canadian Soccer League, and later with Burlington SC from 2013 till 2016. In 2017, he became associated with Burlington SC Academy as the Junior Technical Director.

References

1984 births
Living people
Footballers from Belgrade
Serbian footballers
Association football defenders
FK Zemun players
FK BASK players
London City players
NK Inter Zaprešić players
Croatian Football League players
Super League Greece players
Canadian Soccer League (1998–present) players
Serbian expatriate footballers
Expatriate footballers in Greece
Serbian expatriate sportspeople in Greece
Serbian expatriate sportspeople in Canada
Expatriate soccer players in Canada
Brantford Galaxy players
Halton United players